Straight Shooter is a 1999 German film directed by Thomas Bohn and starring Dennis Hopper, Heino Ferch, Katja Flint, Hannelore Hoger, Ulrich Mühe, and Errol A. C. Trotman Harewood. It is about an ex-member of the French Foreign Legion who makes the German government responsible for the death of his family and goes on a killing spree to stop the service of a nuclear plant.

The police are helpless and so the ex-instructor (Dennis Hopper) of the killer is brought to Germany to hunt the killer down.

External links 
 
 

1999 films
1999 action thriller films
German action thriller films
German crime thriller films
English-language German films
1990s German-language films
Films shot in Cologne
Films about snipers
1990s German films